Kim Dong-chul  (born 1 October 1990) is a South Korean footballer who plays as defender for Seoul E-Land.

External links 
 
 

1990 births
Living people
South Korean footballers
Association football defenders
Jeonnam Dragons players
Seoul E-Land FC players
Asan Mugunghwa FC players
K League 1 players
K League 2 players